Regnellites nagashimae is the oldest known fossil belonging to the fern family Marsileaceae.  It comes from rocks of the Upper Jurassic or Lower Cretaceous Kiyosu-e Formation of Japan. The fossils include leaves with visible veins, as well as sporocarps.

References

Salviniales
Jurassic plants
Jurassic Japan
Fossils of Japan
Prehistoric plant genera
Monotypic fern genera